Ural Airlines Flight 178 was an Ural Airlines scheduled passenger flight from Moscow–Zhukovsky to Simferopol, Crimea. On 15 August 2019, the Airbus A321 operating the flight carried 226 passengers and seven crew. All on board survived; 74 people sustained injuries, but none were severe.

Accident

The aircraft suffered a bird strike shortly after takeoff from Zhukovsky International Airport, Moscow, Russia, bound for Simferopol International Airport, Simferopol, Crimea. A passenger recorded the plane's descent into a cornfield after a flock of gulls struck both CFM56-5 engines. The first bird strike caused a complete loss of power in the left engine. A second bird strike caused the right engine to produce insufficient thrust to maintain flight.

The pilots opted to make an emergency landing in a cornfield beyond the end of the airport runway and decided to shut down both engines just before touchdown. The aircraft made a hard landing in the cornfield  from Zhukovsky International Airport. The pilot chose not to lower the landing gear in order to skid more effectively over the corn.

Everyone on board the flight survived. There have been differing reports on the number of injuries sustained as the criteria for counting a person as "injured" are not overly strict. According to some reports, 55 people received medical attention at the scene. 29 people were taken to hospital, of whom 23 were injured. Six people were admitted as in-patients. The number of injuries was finally fixed at 74, none of whom was severely injured. All passengers were offered  (US$) as accident compensation.

Aircraft
The aircraft was an Airbus A321-211, registered in Bermuda as VQ-BOZ, msn 2117. It was built in 2003 for MyTravel Airways (as G-OMYA), who decided not to accept it; it was then transferred to Cyprus Turkish Airlines as TC-KTD. It then operated for AtlasGlobal as TC-ETR in 2010, and Solaris Airlines in 2011 as EI-ERU, before being delivered to Ural Airlines in 2011 as VQ-BOZ.

The aircraft was damaged beyond repair in the accident and the airline announced that it would be cut up in situ (on site) to be scrapped, in an operation that was scheduled to commence on 23 August 2019. The accident represents the sixth hull loss of an Airbus A321.

Crew 
He has also received a degree in Air Navigation from the Ulyanovsk Institute of Civil Aviation, in Ulyanovsk, Russia. At the time of the accident, he had over 3,000 hours of flight time.

The co-pilot was 23-year-old  who also graduated from the Buguruslan Flight School of Civil Aviation, in 2017. At the time of the accident, he had over 600 hours of flight time.

There were five flight attendants on board.

Proliferation of birds near airport 
The proliferation of birds near Moscow–Zhukovsky is attributed to illegal waste dumps. The deployed bird control measures are overwhelmed and insufficient. The court did not find sufficient grounds to rule in favor of plaintiffs and their demands to enjoin the defendants from sorting or storing household waste at the specified site.

As of 2019, this site is no longer sorting or storing household waste, instead compacting it and transferring it further for disposal; the operations, however, are conducted outdoors.

A Zhukovsky air traffic controller declared:

In September 2019, Rosaviatsiya proposed to work with law enforcement authorities to check the legality of waste dumps near airports, and will also examine the frequency of scheduled and unscheduled inspections of airports for the presence of birds.

Reactions 

Shortly after the accident, Ural Airlines released a statement on Twitter stating: "Flight U6178 Zhukovsky-Simferopol on departure from Zhukovsky sustained multiple bird strikes to the aircraft engines. The aircraft made an emergency landing. There were no injuries to the passengers and crew." The airline praised the professionalism of the pilots.

On social media, immediate comparisons were made between the accident and the "Miracle on the Hudson" incident involving US Airways Flight 1549.

The pilot in command, Damir Yusupov, and first officer, Georgy Murzin, were awarded the honorary title of Hero of the Russian Federation; the other five crew members were decorated with the Order of Courage.

While being praised in Russia, the crew of the aircraft was entered into the blacklist of Ukrainian NGO Myrotvorets ("Peacemaker"), which accused them of "knowingly and on multiple occasions making illegal crossings of the state border of Ukraine".

Author of the first Russian disaster movie Air Crew, Alexander Mitta, announced plans to make a film based on the events of Flight 178.

Investigation
The Interstate Aviation Committee (МАК) opened an investigation into the accident. The investigation is being assisted by Rosaviatsiya, the British Air Accidents Investigation Branch, and the French Bureau d'Enquêtes et d'Analyses pour la Sécurité de l'Aviation Civile. The cockpit voice recorder and flight data recorder were both successfully recovered and their data downloaded.

Instead of being published, the report was leaked in August 2022. The report blames the pilots of several mistakes instead of heroism. An aviation journalist explained one of the main contributing factors was the Russian attitude of avoiding non-standard decisions such as holding on the runway and delaying the takeoff-run or even abort takeoff. Both the crew had seen the birds and were aware of them before takeoff begun, both were swearing because of the birds. As for the continuing events, the crew was described as disorganized as they didn't retract the undercarriage nor disabled the alarm gone off after autopilot disengagement. An emergency landing was not talked about in the cockpit, as a consequence the engines were not shut down on touchdown. Retracting the undercarriage in the last phase of the flight was interpreted as a measure to gain speed by the investigation, not as a preparation for an emergency landing as claimed by the pilots.

Aftermath 
 
 
After the accident, the aircraft was written off and the airline announced that it would be demolished, recycled and scrapped, in an operation that was scheduled to commence on 23 August 2019.

See also 
US Airways Flight 1549 – 2009 accident after both engines failed following a bird strike shortly after takeoff; ditched in the Hudson River, New York
Ethiopian Airlines Flight 604 – 1988 accident after both engines failed following a bird strike shortly after takeoff
Eastern Air Lines Flight 375 – 1960 accident after the aircraft suffered a bird strike shortly after takeoff
1973 DeKalb–Peachtree Airport Learjet crash

References

External links
Interstate Aviation Committee
Airbus A-321-211 VQ-BOZ 15.08.2019
Airbus A-321-211 VQ-BOZ 15.08.2019  – the Russian version is the report of record.

2019 in Moscow
Accidents and incidents involving the Airbus A321
Airliner accidents and incidents caused by bird strikes
August 2019 events in Russia
Aviation accidents and incidents in 2019
Aviation accidents and incidents in Russia
2019 disasters in Russia
Airliner accidents and incidents involving belly landings